Liberty Hall is a historic community building in the Marstons Mills village of Barnstable, Massachusetts.  The -story structure was built in 1859 by a local community group as a function hall.  It has modest Greek Revival styling, with an entablature and corner pilasters, large 12-over-12 sash windows, and an entry vestibule projecting at an angle from one corner.  It continues to be used as a community function space, although it was adapted for a time as the local Methodist church's parish hall.

The building was listed on the National Register of Historic Places in 1987.

See also
National Register of Historic Places listings in Barnstable County, Massachusetts

References

Buildings and structures completed in 1859
Event venues on the National Register of Historic Places in Massachusetts
Buildings and structures in Barnstable, Massachusetts
National Register of Historic Places in Barnstable, Massachusetts